Eben Wever Martin (April 12, 1855 – May 22, 1932) was an American attorney and politician in South Dakota. A Republican, he was most notable for his service as a member of the United States House of Representatives during the early 20th Century.

Early life and education
Martin was born in Maquoketa, Iowa. He attended the public schools of his hometown, and in 1879 he graduated from Cornell College in Mount Vernon, Iowa. He studied at the University of Michigan Law School in 1879 and 1880, was admitted to the bar in 1880 and commenced practice in Deadwood, Dakota Territory.

Congress 
Martin served in the South Dakota Territory House of Representatives in 1884 and 1885, and was president of Deadwood's board of education from 1886 to 1900.

In 1900, Martin was elected as a Republican to Seat B, one of South Dakota's two at-large seats in the United States House of Representatives. He was reelected in 1902 and 1904, and served from March 4, 1901, to March 3, 1907. He ran unsuccessfully for the United States Senate in 1906.

After the death of William H. Parker, Martin won a special election to fill the Seat B vacancy in the U.S. House, and was re-elected to three more terms, serving from November 3, 1908, to March 3, 1915. As a result of the 1910 United States census, South Dakota was apportioned three House members and created three districts. In Martin's 1912 reelection he ran successfully for South Dakota's 3rd congressional district seat. He was not a candidate for re-election in 1914.

Later career 
After leaving Congress, Martin practiced law in Hot Springs, South Dakota.

Death and burial 
He died in Hot Springs on May 22, 1932, and was buried in the city's Evergreen Cemetery.

Legacy 
Martin is the namesake of the city of Martin, South Dakota.

References

External links

1855 births
1932 deaths
People from Maquoketa, Iowa
Republican Party members of the United States House of Representatives from South Dakota
Members of the Dakota Territorial Legislature
School board members in South Dakota
South Dakota lawyers
People from Deadwood, South Dakota
People from Fall River County, South Dakota
19th-century American politicians
University of Michigan Law School alumni

Members of the United States House of Representatives from South Dakota